Metal Heart is the sixth studio album by German heavy metal band Accept, released in 1985.
Although the group had recorded before at Dierks-Studios, this was the first album produced by Dieter Dierks himself. It marked the return of guitarist Jörg Fischer after a two year absence, with Herman Frank having been his replacement. This album was a cautious attempt to crack the lucrative American market with more accessible songcraft and emphasis on hooks and melodies. Although critically panned at the time, today Metal Heart is often considered by fans as one of the band's best records. It contains several of their classic songs such as "Metal Heart" and "Living for Tonite". The band also makes a detour into jazz metal territory with the unusual song "Teach Us to Survive".

Album information
Wolf Hoffmann explained the concept behind the album: "We had read an article that someone was working on an artificial heart and that one day everybody is going to have a computerized heart. It talked, in general terms, about how more and more of humanity gets sucked out of the daily life and more and more replaced by machine. It's not a new thing now, but then it was new. Humans versus machine, was the general vibe of the record." The original cover concept was for a hologram of a metal heart, until budget considerations resulted in a traditional cover. But fittingly for the futuristic theme of the album, Metal Heart was the first Accept album to be digitally mastered.

Hoffmann recalls Dieter Dierks as a very demanding producer: "We would do some pieces several dozen times trying to capture what he had in his mind for a specific section," adding: "Each song we tried different combinations of guitars, mic'ing and even strings!"

The song "Metal Heart" is well known for containing the cover of two famous classical themes: Tchaikovsky's "Slavonic March" (in the intro) and Beethoven's "Für Elise" in the main riff and solo. This song was covered in 1998 by Norwegian black metal band Dimmu Borgir for their album Godless Savage Garden. "I had no idea it would become as popular as it did," Hoffmann remembers of his contribution to the song.

"Midnight Mover", about a drug dealer, is one of the more commercial songs on the album and was selected for a memorable music video that anticipates the bullet time filming technique by a full decade. "Just ahead of our time again!" jests Hoffmann.

Despite the more commercially appealing sound of the album, it fell short of the sales figures of its predecessor Balls to the Wall in America. Udo remembers the Breaker through Metal Heart era as the time when the band got along best together. Thus this would turn out to be the last album of Accept's golden era, as cracks were soon to appear in the band's solidarity.

The 2002 digitally remastered CD edition includes two live bonus tracks, "Love Child" and "Living for Tonite", both taken from the live EP Kaizoku-Ban. The 2013 release from UK based record label Hear No Evil Recordings contains the live EP itself.

Track listing
All lyrics and music written by Accept and Deaffy.

Credits
Band members
 Udo Dirkschneider – lead vocals, harmony vocals (4, 9, 10), backing vocals (1, 8), finger snapping (8)
 Wolf Hoffmann – lead & rhythm guitars (all except 9), rhythm guitar (9), acoustic guitar (1, 10), backing vocals (1, 6, 7, 10), sitar (1)
 Jörg Fischer – rhythm guitar (all except 4, 9), lead & rhythm guitars (4, 9), 8-string bass (3), backing vocals (1, 6, 7, 10), finger snapping (8)
 Peter Baltes – bass, Moog Taurus (1, 5, 7, 10), 8-string bass (1, 8, 10), backing vocals (1, 6, 7, 10), harmony vocals (2, 5), acoustic bass guitar (8)
 Stefan Kaufmann – drums, backing vocals (1, 6, 7, 10), timpani (1, 8, 10), cymbals and gongs (1), drum effects and gang vocals (3)

Production
Dieter Dierks – producer, arrangements
Gerd Rautenbach – engineer
Mike Kashnitz, Peter Brandt – assistant engineers
Bob Ludwig – mastering at Masterdisk, New York
Gaby "Deaffy" Hauke – management, cover concept
Dirksen & Sohn Modellwerkstâtten, Stahl, Werbefotografie – cover art

Charts

References

1985 albums
Accept (band) albums
Portrait Records albums
RCA Records albums
Albums produced by Dieter Dierks